"Dead and Gone" is a 2009 song by T.I., featuring Justin Timberlake.

Dead and Gone may also refer to:

 Dead and Gone (EP), an EP by American rock band Stabbing Westward
 Dead and Gone (novel), a novel by Charlaine Harris
 Dead and Gone, a 1999 crime novel by Dorothy Simpson
 "Dead and Gone", an episode of the TV series NYPD Blue 
 Dead and Gone, a band from This Is Berkeley, Not West Bay
 "Dead and Gone", a song by the Black Keys from the album El Camino
 "Dead and Gone", a song by Gypsy from the 1971 album Gypsy
 "Dead and Gone", a song by Rancid from the 2012 album B Sides and C Sides
 "Dead and Gone", a song by Trivium from the 2015 album Silence in the Snow

See also
 The Dead and the Gone, a science fiction novel by Susan Beth Pfeffer